Nezahualcoyotl (April 28, 1402 – June 4, 1472) was a scholar, philosopher (tlamatini), warrior, architect, poet and ruler (tlatoani) of the city-state of Texcoco in pre-Columbian era Mexico. Unlike other high-profile Mexican figures from the century preceding Spanish conquest of the Aztec Empire, Nezahualcoyotl was not fully Mexica; his father's people were the Acolhua, another Nahuan people settled in the eastern part of the Valley of Mexico, on the coast of Lake Texcoco. His mother, however, was the sister of Chimalpopoca, the Mexica king of Tenochtitlan.

He is best remembered for his poetry, but according to accounts by his descendants and biographers, Fernando de Alva Cortés Ixtlilxóchitl and Juan Bautista Pomar, he had an experience of an "Unknown, Unknowable Lord of Everywhere" to whom he built an entirely empty temple in which no blood sacrifices of any kind were allowed — not even those of animals. However, he allowed human sacrifices to continue in his other temples.

Name
The Nahuatl name Nezahualcoyotl is commonly translated as “hungry coyote” or “fasting coyote.” However, more accurately, it means "coyote with a fasting collar," from nezahualli, a collar made out of bands of paper twisted together. It was worn by those fasting to show others that they shouldn’t be offered food.

Early life

Born Acolmiztli, he was the son of Ixtlilxochitl I and Matlalcihuatzin, the daughter of Huitzilihuitl. Though born heir to a throne, his youth was not marked by princely luxury. His father had set Texcoco against the powerful city of Azcapotzalco, ruled by the Tepanec. In 1418, when the young prince was fifteen, his father was assassinated.

The Tepanecs of Azcapotzalco, led by Tezozomoc, conquered Texcoco and Acolmiztli had to flee into exile in Huexotzinco. After various adventures during which he took the name Nezahualcoyotl, the prince returned to stay in Tenochtitlan in 1422. His aunts bribed the Tepanec king and allowed for him to be partially educated as a Mexica. His exposure to Mexica culture and politics would influence how he later governed Texcoco. After Tezozomoc's son Maxtla became ruler of Azcapotzalco, Nezahualcoyotl returned to Texcoco, but had to go into exile a second time when he learned that Maxtla plotted against his life.

The reconquest of Texcoco

As the tlatoani Itzcoatl of Tenochtitlan requested help from the Huexotzincans against the Tepanecs, Nezahualcoyotl envisioned a single military force in order to fight the mighty kingdom of Atzcapotzalco. After being offered support from insurgents inside Acolhuacan and rebel Tepanecs from Coyohuacan, Nezahualcoyotl joined the war. He called for a coalition consisting of many of the most important pre-Hispanic cities of the time: Tenochtitlan, Tlacopan, Tlatelolco, Huexotzingo, Tlaxcala and Chalco.

The war was declared a shared and single effort, and the coalition army of more than 100,000 men under the command of Nezahualcoyotl and other important tlatoque headed towards Atzcapotzalco from the city of Calpulalpan. This began the military offensive that would reconquer Acolhuacan in 1428.

The campaign was divided into three parts. One army attacked Acolman to the north and the second Coatlinchan to the south. A contingent led by Nezahualcoyotl himself was intended to attack Acolhuacan, only after providing support, upon request, to the first two armies. The coalition conquered Acolman and Otumba, sacking them only due to the sudden Tepanec siege of Tenochtitlan and Tlatelolco.

In a tactical move, the three armies united again and then divided into two. One of them, under Nezahualcoyotl, headed towards Texcoco laying siege to Acolhuacan on its way, while the other attacked and destroyed Atzcapotzalco. At the time the armies met again, Nezahualcoyotl reclaimed Texcoco and decided to conquer Acolhuacan, entering from the north while the Tenochca and Tlacopan allies coming from Azcapotzalco attacked from the south. The two armies simultaneously attacked Acolhuacan from two directions until they controlled the city's main square.

After their victory, the coalition began a series of attacks to isolated Tepanec posts throughout the territory of Texcoco. The defeat of the Tepanecs and the total destruction of the kingdom of Azcapotzalco gave rise to the Aztec Triple Alliance between Texcoco, Tenochtitlan, and Tlacopan.  Nezahualcoyotl was eventually crowned Tlatoani of Texcoco in 1431.

A decade later, eager to produce a noble heir, Nezahualcoyotl married Azcalxochitzin after the death of her first husband, King Cuahcuauhtzin of Tepechpan.

Legal system and punishments 

According to Motolinia, Nezahualcoyotl practiced his strict laws judiciously and imposed them on all his subjects. He killed four of his sons for their sexual relationships with his concubines. Conquered cities paid tribute that was distributed among three kings. Fourteen cities were under Nezahualcoyotl, including Otompan, Huexotla, Coatlichan, Chimalhuacan, Tepetlaoztoc, Chiauhtla, Tezoyucan, Teotihuacan, Acolman, Tepechpan, Chiconauhlt, Xicotepec, Cuauhchinanco, and Tulantzino.

Nezahualcoyotl adopted the Mexica legal system into his empire to help in the reconstruction of his city. There were eighty laws that he enacted; among them were laws about crime and punishment including treason, robbery, adultery, homosexuality, homicide, alcohol abuse, misuse of inheritances, and military misconduct. The Mapa Quinatzin depicts the hanging of a robber for stealing or breaking into a house. In cases of military misconduct, for example those soldiers who did not follow orders or killed captives, the condemned were hanged or beheaded. Nobles were not immune to such punishments.

Achievements

Revered as a sage and poet-king, Nezahualcoyotl gathered a group of followers called the tlamatini, generally translated as "wise men". These men were scholars, artists, musicians and sculptors who pursued their art in the court of Texcoco.

Nezahualcoyotl is credited with cultivating what came to be known as Texcoco's Golden Age, which brought the rule of law, scholarship and artistry to the city and set high standards that influenced surrounding cultures. Nezahualcoyotl designed a code of law based on the division of power, which created the councils of finance, war, justice and culture (the last actually called the "Council of Music"). Under his rule Texcoco flourished as the intellectual center of the Triple Alliance and was home to an extensive library that, tragically, did not survive the Spanish conquest. He also established an academy of music and welcomed worthy entrants from all regions of Mesoamerica.

Texcoco has been called "the Athens of the Western World"—to quote the historian Lorenzo Boturini Bernaducci. Indeed, the remains of hilltop gardens, sculptures and a massive aqueduct system show the impressive engineering skills and aesthetic appreciation of his reign.

Many believe, however, that of all the creative intellects nurtured by this Texcocan "Athens," by far the greatest belonged to the king himself. He is considered one of the great designers and architects of the pre-Hispanic era. He is said to have personally designed the "albarrada de Nezahualcoyotl" ("dike of Nezahualcoyotl") to separate the fresh and brackish waters of Lake Texcoco, a system that was still in use over a century after his death.

Legacy
The date of Nezahualcoyotl's death is recorded as being June 4, 1472, survived by many concubines and an estimated 110 children. He was succeeded by his son Nezahualpilli as tlatoani of Texcoco.

His great-grandson Juan Bautista Pomar is credited with the compilations of a collection of Nahuatl poems. Romances de los señores de la Nueva España, and with a chronicle of the history of the Aztecs. The freshwater fish Xiphophorus nezahualcoyotl is named after Nezahualcoyotl. Nezahualcoyotl appears on the current 100 peso banknote of Mexico.

Poetry

One of Nezahualcoyotl's historical legacies is as a poet and a number of works in the Classical Nahuatl language written in the 16th and 17th centuries have been ascribed to him. In fact this attribution is testament to the long lifespan of oral tradition, since Nezahualcoyotl died almost 50 years before the conquest and the poems were written down another fifty years after that. Juan Bautista de Pomar was a grandson of Nezahualcoyotl and likely wrote them from memory of the oral tradition.
Poems attributed to Nezahualcoyotl include:
In chololiztli (The Flight)
Ma zan moquetzacan (Stand Up!)
Nitlacoya (I Am Sad)
Xopan cuicatl (Song of Springtime)
Ye nonocuiltonohua (I Am Wealthy)
Zan yehuan (He Alone)
Xon Ahuiyacan (Be Joyful)

See also
 Texcoco (altepetl)
 History of the Aztecs
 Aztec Empire
 Mexican literature
 Nahuatl
 Ixtlilxochitl I
 Nezahualpilli
 Cuacuauhtzin
 Aztec mythology

Notes

References
 León-Portilla, Miguel; Fifteen Poets of the Aztec World University of Oklahoma Press, October 2000.
 Prescott, William; The History of the Conquest of Mexico, Book 1, Chapter 6.
 Lee, Jongsoo; "A reinterpretation of Nahuatl poetics: Rejecting the image of Nezahualcoyotl as a peaceful poet" in Colonial Latin American Review, December 2003, Vol. 12 Issue 2, p 233-249.
 Curl, John; Ancient American PoetsThe Flower Songs of Nezahualcoyotl, Bilingual Press, 2005,

External links
 http://www.ku.edu/~hoopes/506/Lectures/Aztecs.html
 http://www.nndb.com/people/773/000095488/
 Flower Songs of Nezahualcoyotl  YouTube
 
 Poems of Nezahualcoyotl read in Nahuatl YouTube

1402 births
1472 deaths
Tlatoque of Texcoco
Nahuatl-language poets
People from Texcoco, State of Mexico
Mexican philosophers